Golden Lotus is a musical written and composed by George Chiang. The musical is based on the classic c. 1610 Chinese novel Jin Ping Mei (The Golden Lotus).  Set amidst the dying, war-torn years of Song Dynasty China, the musical tells the story of the beautiful Golden Lotus (Pan Jinlian) whose desire for true love leads her into a blood-soaked web of passion, deception and desperation with the valiant tiger slayer Wu Sung, the rich and powerful Xi Men (Ximen Qing) and the humble peddler Wu Da (Wu Dalang).  Betwixt a story of political satire, a doomed love story, and an epic tale of heroism, therein lies also a story of a woman's transformation and her eventual path to redemption.

Development
Golden Lotus was the first Canadian musical to participate in the prestigious ASCAP Foundation/Disney Theatrical Productions Musical Theatre Workshop in New York City during March and April 2003, artistic directed by Stephen Schwartz.  The three-week workshop included two live performances by a cast of sixteen performers which included Harriet Chung as Golden Lotus, Timothy Huang as Wu Sung, Jovanni Sy as Xi Men,  Alan Ariano as Wu Da, Telly Leung as the Fruit Peddler and Scott Watanabe (who also served as the music director) as the District Intendant.

Production
On September 12, 2014, Golden Lotus opened in Hong Kong with a cast of twenty-six performers at the Y-Theatre. The production starred Harriet Chung as the title character, Boon Ho Sung as Wu Sung, and Ronan Pak Kin Yan as Ximen Qing.  Also featured were Billy Sy as Wu Da, Samantha Fa as Madam Wang, Scott Watanabe as the District Intendant, Marc Ngan as the Fruit Peddler and Soraya Chau as Ping. The production was directed by Emily Chan with music arrangements by George Gao, choreography by Ivy Chung and set & costume design by Moe Mo. The musical's score which blends pop rock and Chinese music traditions along with its signature pop love song, "A World Away", were unanimously praised by the Hong Kong critics.  "More than an enjoyable theatrical experience."  "The music is first rate and unforgettable."  "A great milestone and a great achievement ...  Golden (Lotus) is a great and novel experience for the theatre lover...  brilliant on its own terms, and anyone who loves a good musical or a good story should go watch it." "Clear traces of some of the greatest western musicals." The production garnered three Hong Kong English Drama Award nominations for Best Show, Best Actress [Harriet Chung] and won for Best Original Work.

Musical film
The Hong Kong production was captured live during four consecutive performances and edited into a feature length film. Released in September 2021 to film festivals around the world the feature length film has received critical praise. "The most important part of any musical is the music itself and it is here that 'Golden Lotus' manages to shine.  The actors sing perfectly, the music aiding their performances in a magical way .... Sure to be a cultural phenomenon, the Golden Lotus is a mesmerizing achievement with stunning choreography and equally stunning physical performances."  The musical film has won dozens of awards across the globe.

Recordings

Golden Lotus: Sounds From The Musical' was released on May 31, 2015.  It is a CD consisting of 15 songs from the musical as they appeared in the Hong Kong world premiere. Recorded in Toronto with Harriet Chung as Golden Lotus, Charles Azulay as Wu Sung, Thom Allison as Xi Men, George Chiang as Wu Da, Stacey-Lea Marhue as Madam Wang, Scott Watanabe as the District Intendant, Pierre Bayuga as the Fruit Peddler and Josette Jorge as Ping.  Music directed by Tim Stiff. Vocal arrangements by Tim Stiff.  Music arrangements by George Gao.

A single of the signature pop ballad from Golden Lotus, A World Away, was recorded by Harriet Chung.  The song was newly arranged by Warren Robert who also conducted the live orchestra for the recording.  Both the single and its music video were dropped on August 25, 2020 as A World Away (Remix).  The single won for Best Original Song at the Hollywood Gold Awards and has won over a dozen Best Music Video awards.  Chung's performance in the music video also and also garnered Chung a Best Actress award by the Only The Best International Film Awards in Miami.

Musical numbers

Awards

Theatre awards and nominations received by Golden Lotus

Film awards and nominations received by Golden Lotus

References

External links

2014 musicals
2020s musical films
Canadian musicals
Hong Kong musicals
Musicals based on novels
Plays set in the 13th century
Plays set in China